Kieran Andrew Bull (born 25 April 1995) is a Welsh professional cricketer who played for Glamorgan County Cricket Club. He is an off spiner. He was born at Haverfordwest in Pembrokeshire. Bull was released by Glamorgan ahead of the 2021 County Championship.

References

External links
 

1993 births
Welsh cricketers
Glamorgan cricketers
Wales National County cricketers
Cardiff MCCU cricketers
Living people